The U.S. Courthouse and Post Office in Aberdeen, Mississippi was built in 1885.  Also known as Old Federal Building, it served historically as a courthouse and as a post office.  It was listed on the National Register of Historic Places in 1976.

It is a red brick and gray stone 2-1/2-story building in the "Victorian Romanesque style embellished with Gothic and Classical details." It has terra cotta decorations.

William A. Freret replaced Mifflin E. Bell as architect during the project.

References

Government buildings completed in 1885
Former federal courthouses in the United States
Courthouses on the National Register of Historic Places in Mississippi
Post office buildings on the National Register of Historic Places in Mississippi
National Register of Historic Places in Monroe County, Mississippi
1885 establishments in Mississippi